The Roman Catholic Diocese of Andros was a Latin catholic bishopric in insular Greece. In 1919, it was absorbed by the Roman Catholic Archdiocese of Naxos, Andros, Tinos and Mykonos.

Ordinaries

Diocese of Andros
Erected: 13th Century
Latin Name: Andrensis

Guglielmo Bruno (26 Aug 1492 - 1531 Died) 
Marino Grimani (6 Sep 1531 - ) 
Bonaventura Bellemo, O.F.M. (22 Jun 1587 - 1602 Died)
Eustache Fontana, O.P. (12 Aug 1602 - 1611 Died)
Nicolaus Righi (3 Aug 1616 - 7 Oct 1619 Appointed, Bishop of Tinos) 
Paulus Pucciarelli, O.P. (7 Jun 1621 - 1631)
Albertus Aliprandi (28 Apr 1631 - 1634 Died) 
Dominici de Grammatica (12 Jun 1634 - 1656 Died) 
Giovanni Battista Paterio (12 Sep 1672 - ) 
Ignatius Rosa (27 May 1675 - 1698 Died) 

3 June 1919 United with the Diocese of Mykonos, the Archdiocese of Naxos, and the Diocese of Tinos to form the Archdiocese of Naxos, Andros, Tinos e Mykonos

See also 
Catholic Church in Greece

References

Former Roman Catholic dioceses in Europe